Elections to the newly created Moray District Council were held on 7 May 1974, the same day as the other Scottish local government elections.

A new system of regional and district governance had been created by the Local Government (Scotland) Act 1973, with Moray District Council encompassing the bulk of the territory covered by the prior Moray County Council. The election saw Independent candidates winning near total dominance of the council, with only 2 seats being taken by a party affiliated candidate.

Election results

Ward results

References

1974
1974 Scottish local elections
20th century in Moray